Mohammad Sadri (September 8, 1963) is an Iranian film director, writer, film producer and cinematographer.

Biography
Sadri was born in Tehran, Iran.  He graduated in cinema from the Art University of Tehran.  He has travelled extensively, particularly in war zones such as Afghanistan, Cuba, Ghana, Bosnia Herzegovina, Iraq and Sudan.
He took part in the war between Iran and Iraq as a cinematographer with a filming group named "Revaiat e Fat'h" with his friend Morteza Avini.

Films 
Papoosh (2008)
Arbaeen (2007)
Shanjar O Shaghaiegh
Afghanestan Sarzamin Khasteh

Books 
The Concept of Reality in Art And Cinema (1998)
Filmbardari Mostanade Jangi (1995)
Saiareh Ranj (1)
Saiareh Ranj (2)

External links
Iranian Movie Database
https://web.archive.org/web/20080229045608/http://www.simafilmnews.ir/content/view/626/9/
http://www.mortezaavini.com/farsi/Film/2.asp

1963 births
Living people
Iranian film directors
Iranian screenwriters
Iranian art directors
People from Tehran